Ida Yessica Nesse (born 19 October 1992) is a Norwegian Paralympic athlete who competes in discus throw and shot put at international elite competitions. She is a European champion in the discus throw and has competed at the 2016 Summer Paralympics where she finished seventh. She has qualified to compete at the 2020 Summer Paralympics.

References

1992 births
Living people
Sportspeople from Bærum
Paralympic athletes of Norway
Norwegian female discus throwers
Norwegian female shot putters
Athletes (track and field) at the 2016 Summer Paralympics
Medalists at the World Para Athletics European Championships
21st-century Norwegian women